This list of oil and gas fields of the North Sea contains links to oil and natural gas reservoirs beneath the North Sea. In terms of the oil industry, "North Sea oil" often refers to a larger geographical set, including areas such as the Norwegian Sea and the UK "Atlantic Margin" (west of Shetland) which are not, strictly speaking, part of the North Sea. The UK list includes facilities in the Irish Sea.

List of fields

South to north.

Netherlands

Onshore 
 Annerveen gas field -  After Groningen, Annerveen is the largest gas field in the Netherlands. The field straddles the boundary between the Groningen and Drenthe.
 Groningen gas field - huge gas discovery
 Rijswijk oil field - oilfield with a Lower Cretaceous reservoir
 Schoonebeek oil field - largest onshore oilfield in Western Europe

Offshore 
 Serviced from Den Helder
 Zuidwal
 Ameland - gasfield that started production in the mid-1980s
 De Ruyter oil field - most recent offshore oil development (2006)
 Hanze oil field - most northern oil field in the Dutch sector (2001)
 Many fields in Quadrants P, Q, K (e.g. K12-B), L, and some in blocks E, F)
Helder, Helm and Hoorn oil fields
K7-K12 gas fields
K13 gas fields
K14-K18 gas fields
Kotter and Logger oil and gas fields
L10 gas field
L4-L7 gas fields
L8-D gas field

United Kingdom

Onshore 
See article Onshore oil and gas fields in the United Kingdom

Offshore 
The UK continental shelf (UKCS) comprises six geographical and geological oil, gas and condensate regions: Southern North Sea (principally gas fields); Central North Sea (oil, condensate and gas fields); Moray Firth (oil and associated gas fields); Northern North Sea (oil and associated gas fields); West of Shetland (oil and associated gas); and the Irish Sea/Liverpool Bay (oil and gas). The fields and installations in the following list are allocated to regions corresponding to the Oil and Gas Authority's listings.

Installation Identification

Oil and gas field names follow themes chosen by the companies who originally developed them. An offshore installation on the UK Continental Shelf may comprise a single integrated platform or two or more bridge-linked platforms. Installations are identified by a large black-on-yellow sign on the installation. This may give the name of the original or current owner or operator, the field name, and a set of numbers and letters, e.g. Shell/Esso Leman 49/26A. The numbers identify the Quadrant and Block where the installation is located, e.g. 49/26 is in Quadrant 49 Block 26.[6] The first letter is a sequential letter (A, B, C, D, etc.) identifying each installation within a field. For installations in the Southern North Sea the second and subsequent letters may designate a platform's function, e.g. the Leman 49/26A complex comprises four bridge-linked platforms 49/26AP (Production), 49/26AD1 (Drilling 1), 49/26AD2 (Drilling 2), and 49/26AK (Compression). Common designations are:

Note: Drilling refers to the original function of the platform to support well drilling operations. No Southern North Sea installation has permanent drilling facilities.

On some installations the letters simply provide a unique two letter identity, e.g.Tethys TN, Viscount VO.

Southern North Sea gas fields 
The Southern North Sea (SNS) comprises gas (plus associated condensate) fields. Themed field names comprise groups of fields that are geographically, operationally or commercially linked. Names are based on:
 Geographical location (Leman, Sole Pit, etc.)
 Personal names (e.g. Audrey, Sean)
 ‘Lost’ east coast villages (Ravenspurn, Newsham, etc.)
 Arthurian legend (e.g. Camelot, Excalibur, Guinevere)
 Planets and moons (Jupiter, Ganymede, etc.)
 Gemstones (Amethyst, Topaz)
 Scientists and inventors (e.g. Murdoch, Davy)
 Rivers (Tyne, Waveney, etc.)
 Sailing vessels (e.g. Ketch, schooner)
 Aircraft (Vulcan, Valiant, Victor, etc.)
A full listing of UK Southern North Sea gas fields is given in the table below.

The SNS fields are serviced from Easington, Lowestoft, Hartlepool, Great Yarmouth, Skegness, Norwich airport and Humberside airport.

Central North Sea fields 
The Central North Sea comprises oil, condensate and gas fields. They are serviced from Aberdeen and Hartlepool

Moray Firth fields 
These fields are in Quadrants 11 to 16. Serviced from Aberdeen

West of Shetland oil fields 
Located in Quadrants 204, 205 and 206, these fields are serviced from Aberdeen and Lerwick

Northern North Sea oil fields 
Serviced from Aberdeen and Scasta airport

Irish Sea gas/oil fields 
These UK fields are located in two main areas of the eastern Irish Sea: Morecambe Bay and Liverpool Bay. Although not part of the North Sea they are on the UK Continental Shelf. The fields are serviced from Liverpool, Blackpool and Morecambe.

Germany

Onshore 
 Wietze near Hanover, discovered in 1859
 The Schoenebeek field of the Netherlands extends across the border

Offshore 
 Mittelplate, approx. 2 Mio m³/a of crude oil production
 A6/B4, gas field 300 km in the North Sea, gas transport via the NOGAT pipeline
Schwedeneck-See oil field (Baltic Sea)

Denmark

Onshore 
No onshore developments

Offshore 
Offshore development is abundant. Of the 19 fields, 15 are operated by Maersk Oil and Gas as part of the Dansk Undergrunds Consortium, with the remaining 4 operated by DONG Energy (3) and Hess (1).
 Nils oil field
 Skjold oil field - chalk reservoir
 Gorm oil and gas field - chalk reservoir
 Roar oil field - chalk reservoir
 Harald oil field - chalk reservoir
 Dan oil field - chalk reservoir
 Kraka oil field - chalk reservoir
 Halfdan oil and gas field - chalk reservoir
 Tyra oil and gas field - chalk reservoir
 Tyra Southeast oil field
 Svend oil field
 Valdemar oil field
 Lulita gas field
 Regnar oil field
 Rolf oil field
 Dagmar oil field
 Siri oil field
 Nini oil field
 Cecilie oil field
 South Arne oil and gas field

Norway

Onshore 
No onshore developments

Offshore 
Serviced from Stavanger, Bergen, Kristiansund

Southern North Sea
 Ivar Aasen oil field
 Johan Sverdrup oil field

Central North Sea

 Yme field - operated by Repsol
 Hod oil field - chalk reservoir, operated by AkerBP
 Valhall oil field - chalk reservoir, operated by AkerBP
 Eldfisk - chalk reservoir, operated by ConocoPhillips
 Ekofisk - chalk reservoir, operated by ConocoPhillips
 Embla oil field - Devonian / Permian reservoir, operated by ConocoPhillips
 Tor oil field - chalk reservoir, operated by ConocoPhillips
 Albuskjell oilfield - decommissioned
 Tambar oil field - Upper Jurassic sandstone reservoir, operated by AkerBP
 Ula oil field - Jurassic sandstone reservoir, operated by AkerBP
 Gyda oil field - Jurassic sandstone reservoir, operated by Repsol
 Blane oil field - Paleocene sandstone reservoir, operated by Repsol
 Oselvar oil field - decommissioned
 Cod oil field - decommissioned
Njord oil field, operated by Statoil

Northern North Sea

 Sleipner oil field - Jurassic and Palaeocene reservoirs, operated by Statoil
 Brisling oil field
 Bream oil field
 Balder oil field - Palaeocene/Eocene, operated by ExxonMobil
 Frigg gas field - large Eocene reservoir gas field
 Gudrun gas/oil field - Jurassic reservoir, high pressure, being developed by Equinor
 Hild gas field
 Heimdal gas field - Palaeocene reservoir, operated by Equinor
 Vale gas field - operated by Equinor
 Oseberg oil field Middle Jurassic sandstone reservoir operated by Equinor
 Grane oil field - operated by Equinor
 Brage oil field - operated by Wintershall
 Troll - largest gas field in North Sea, operated by Equinor
 Gullfaks oil field - Middle Jurassic reservoir, operated by Equinor
 Statfjord - along strike from Brent, but structurally deeper, partially in UK sector; operated by Equinor
 Snorre oil field - Middle Jurassic reservoir, operated by Equinor
 Marihøne oil field - operated in partnership by Marathon Oil, ConocoPhillips and Lundin Petroleum
 Murchison oil field (part of; produced through UK) operated by Canadian Natural Resources Limited
 Agat
 Haltenbank - numerous developments in production, including Heidrun gasfied, Draugen oil field, and Ormen Lange

Associated - not North Sea

Ireland (includes Northern Ireland)

Onshore 
 Larne - tiny prospect under the basalts
 Other small prospects, and significant coal-bed methane

Offshore 
 Kinsale Head - gas development off the coast of Cork, exhausted and now proposed for use as carbon dioxide or natural gas storage
 Corrib gas field - about to start production to an onshore processing plant
 Inishbeg - prospect announced to the NW of Donegal; due to be drilled August 2006
 Barryroe - oil and gas discovery south of Cork; appraisal results formally announced March 2012 
 Dunquin - off Irish west coast; owned by ExxonMobil, Repsol, Providence and Sosina; drilling was to start in 2013 on a potentially large field
 Spanish Point - field due for exploration in 2013, due north of Dunquin, off County Clare on the Irish West Coast
 Dalkey Island - Irish Sea prospect

Faroes

Offshore 
 Various blocks licensed for exploration, several discoveries not yet developed

Iceland

Offshore 
 Nothing published, but the idea is not inconceivable on the ridges extending towards Iceland from the Faroes and the East Greenland Coast

East Greenland

Onshore 
 No prospects reported, though sediments analogous to the Mesozoic and Caenozoic deposits of the North Sea are known, so there is appreciable interest. Development would be formidably difficult, technically, logistically and politically.

Offshore 
 A recent conference on hydrocarbon prospects in arctic Russia (Geological Society, London; February 2006) had several speakers mention major gas prospectivity on the East Greenland coast, but they cited no sources. A conference volume was due towards the end of 2006, which may elaborate.

Barents Sea

Onshore 
 No significant prospects or potential

Offshore 
Serviced from Harstad and Hammerfest

 Significant exploration, appraisal and development. Major discoveries are the Snøhvit gasfield and the Johan Castberg field (in development), operated by Equinor and the Alta/Gohta field (early phase), operated by Lundin Petroleum, both in the Norwegian sector and the Stokhmanovskoye gasfield planned to be operated by Gazprom in the Russian sector.

See also

 Norwegian oil fields
 List of oil and gas fields in Albania
 List of oil fields
 Economy of Norway
 Economy of the United Kingdom
 Geology of the United Kingdom
 Oil platform

References

External links
 Interactive map over the Norwegian Continental Shelf, live information, facts, pictures and videos

North Sea
North Sea energy
North Sea
North Sea